The 2008–09 season was Grimsby Town's 5th season in League Two. The club were still managed by Alan Buckley until September, when he was dismissed after poor pre-season and poor start to the club's League campaign. Mike Newell was given the job on a permanent basis after assistant manager Stuart Watkiss briefly took control of first-team affairs.

Matches

Legend

Pre-season and friendlies

The Mariners struggled to gel in pre-season, and it became clear the club would struggle in the league. Manager Alan Buckley included utilised his first team squad in the games against Corby, Oldham and Gainsborough, while a weakened side took a 5–1 drubbing by Eastwood Town.

Lincolnshire Cup

A late strike from Peter Bore gave a youth dominated Grimsby side the win against Lincoln City in the semi finals, only to see another youthful side get be well beaten, in the next round by Scunthorpe United.

League Two

FA Cup

Football League Cup

Football League Trophy

League table
Brentford made a return to League One as champions, the second club to win the fourth tier three times since Doncaster Rovers. Exeter won their second successive promotion, and on the final day of the season managed to pip Wycombe Wanderers for the runners-up spot. Wycombe themselves managed the final automatic promotion spot by virtue of a single goal over Bury. The play-offs were won by Gillingham, who made an immediate return to League One after the previous season's relegation.

Several teams suffered heavy points deductions during the season. Rotherham were docked 17 points at the start of the season and Darlington 10 points later on. Without these penalties they would have both qualified for the play-offs, but instead managed only mid table. Bournemouth also suffered a 17-point deduction pre-season, and halfway through it looked to be enough to cost them their League status; however, a fightback under new manager Eddie Howe saw them climb to safety and secure survival with a game to spare.

Luton suffered the heaviest deduction however, and the loss of 30 points proved too much for them to survive. They suffered their third successive relegation and dropped out of the league, making them only the third English team to suffer three successive relegations, and the first to drop from the second tier to the Conference in successive years. The other relegated team was Chester City, who were statistically the worst team in the division and returned to the Conference after only five years. Grimsby would also have suffered relegation, if not for Luton's points deduction.

Coaching staff

First-team squad

Squad overview

Appearances & Goals

|}

Loaned out player stats

|}

Most frequent starting line-up

Most frequent starting line-up uses the team's most used formation: 4-4-2. The players used are those who have played the most games in each respective position, not necessarily who have played most games out of all the players.

Scorers

All

League

Domestic Cups

Transfers

In

Pre-season

Mid Season

Out

Pre-season

Mid Season

See also
List of Grimsby Town F.C. seasons

References

Grimsby Town F.C. seasons
Grimsby Town